Gurmeet Choudhary (born 22 February 1984) is an Indian actor and martial artist and born in Bhagalpur Bihar. He is known for his portrayal of Rama in Ramayan, Maan Singh Khurana in  Geet – Hui Sabse Parayi and Yash Suraj Pratap Sindhina in Punar Vivaah - Zindagi Milegi Dobara. In 2012, Gurmeet participated in Jhalak Dikhhla Jaa 5 and emerged as the winner. He also participated in Nach Baliye 6 and Fear Factor: Khatron Ke Khiladi 5 and emerged as the 1st runner-up in both. He made his film debut with Fox Studio's psychological thriller and horror Khamoshiyan.

Early life and background
Gurmeet was born in Jairampur village in Bhagalpur, Bihar, India in a Bhumihar family.  The Gurmeet Choudhary Foundation launched a post-Covid specialised care centre at his hometown.  His elder brother is a general physician in his hometown.

Personal life 

On 15 February 2011, Choudhary married actress Debina Bonnerjee. On 4 October 2021, they married again. 

On 3 April 2022, they had their first child, a girl. On 11 November 2022, they had their second child, another girl.

Career 
Gurmeets first gained prominence through his portrayal of Rama in the 2009 television series Ramayan, opposite Debina Bonnerjee who played the role of Sita. Choudhary participated in the reality show Pati Patni Aur Woh with his then fiancée, Debina Bonnerjee who also played Sita in Ramayan. After this show, he played the role of a business magnate Maan Singh Khurana in Geet – Hui Sabse Parayi alongside Drashti Dhami. He played a lead role in the show Punar Vivah as Yash Sindhia, alongside Kratika Sengar.

Gurmeet participated in and won the fifth season of the popular dance contest Jhalak Dikhhla Jaa with choreographer Shampa Sonthalia. He competed in the dance contest Nach Baliye 6 alongside his wife Debina Bonnerjee, his co-star from Ramayan, whom he had married in 2011, in which he finished as the first runner up. They were choreographed by Pratik Utekar. He participated in an action reality show Fear Factor: Khatron Ke Khiladi (season 5) where he was named the first runner-up.

Gurmeet Choudhary's first foray into the Bollywood film industry was in 2015 when he was cast as the character of Jaidev in the psychological thriller Khamoshiyan, produced by Fox Studios India and Vishesh Films.

He is also a trained martial artist.

Filmography

Films

Television

Special appearances

Music videos

See also 

 List of Indian television actors
List of Indian film actors

References

External links 

 
 

Living people
Dancing with the Stars winners
Indian male soap opera actors
Indian male television actors
Male actors from Bihar
Fear Factor: Khatron Ke Khiladi participants
1984 births